The 2018 Louisiana Ragin' Cajuns football team represented the University of Louisiana at Lafayette in the 2018 NCAA Division I FBS football season. The Ragin' Cajuns played their home games at Cajun Field in Lafayette, Louisiana and competed in the West Division of the Sun Belt Conference. They were led by first-year head coach Billy Napier. They finished the season 7–7, 5–3 in Sun Belt play to finish in a tie for the West Division championship with Arkansas State. Due to their head-to-head win over Arkansas State, they represented the West Division in the inaugural Sun Belt Championship Game where they lost to East Division champion Appalachian State. They were invited to the Cure Bowl where they lost to Tulane.

Previous season
The Ragin' Cajuns finished the 2017 season 5–7, 4–4 in Sun Belt play to finish in a three-way tie for fifth place.

On December 3, head coach Mark Hudspeth was fired. He finished with a seven-year record of 51–38. However, due to NCAA sanctions in 2016 because former assistant coach David Saunders arranged fraudulent college entrance exams for recruits, his official record was 29–38. On December 15, the school hired Billy Napier as head coach.

Preseason

Recruiting class

Award watch lists
Listed in the order that they were released

Sun Belt coaches poll
On July 19, 2018, the Sun Belt released their preseason coaches poll with the Ragin' Cajuns predicted to finish in fourth place in the West Division.

Preseason All-Sun Belt Teams
The Ragin' Cajuns had two players selected to the preseason all-Sun Belt teams.

Offense

1st team

Kevin Dotson – OL

2nd team

Trey Ragas – RB

Roster

Schedule
The 2018 schedule consists of 6 home and 6 away games in the regular season. The Ragin' Cajuns will host Sun Belt foes Arkansas State, Coastal Carolina, Georgia State, and South Alabama. The Cajuns will travel to Sun Belt foes Appalachian State, Louisiana-Monroe, Texas State, and Troy.

The Ragin' Cajuns will host two of the four non-conference opponents, Grambling State of the Southwestern Athletic Conference (SWAC) and the New Mexico State, an Independent school, and will travel to Southeastern Conference (SEC) members Alabama and Mississippi State.

The Ragin' Cajuns will travel once more to face off with the Appalachian State Mountaineers in the first annual Sun Belt Conference Championship Game.

Schedule Source:

Game summaries

Grambling State

at Mississippi State

Coastal Carolina

at Alabama

at Texas State

New Mexico State

at Appalachian State

Arkansas State

at Troy

Georgia State

South Alabama

at Louisiana–Monroe

at Appalachian State (Sun Belt Championship Game)

vs. Tulane (Cure Bowl)

References

Louisiana
Louisiana Ragin' Cajuns football seasons
Louisiana Ragin' Cajuns football